William Lord Dyson (11 December 1857 – 1 May 1936) was an English first-class cricketer, who played two matches for Yorkshire County Cricket Club in 1887 against Sussex and Surrey.

Born in Rastrick, Brighouse, Yorkshire, England, Dyson was a right-handed batsman who scored 8 runs, at an average of 2.00, with a top score of 6.  He did not bowl in first-class cricket, although he did take two catches in the field.

Dyson died in May 1936 in Brighouse.

References

External links
Cricinfo Profile
Cricket Archive Statistics

1857 births
1936 deaths
Yorkshire cricketers
People from Brighouse
English cricketers
People from Rastrick